The Sault News is the main daily and newspaper of record of Sault Ste. Marie, Michigan, United States. It is owned by Gannett.  Circulation is 1,900 in the Soo area, including Chippewa County, Michigan.

The paper was founded in 1901 as the Sault Ste. Marie Daily News, taking the names The Sault News-Record and The Daily News-Record later that year and eventually adopting the name The Evening News in 1903.

See also
 Sault Star, the daily newspaper for Sault Ste. Marie, Ontario, Canada

Notes

External links
 
 The Evening News online index
 GateHouse Media

Newspapers published in Michigan
Mass media in Sault Ste. Marie, Michigan
Newspapers established in 1901
Gannett publications
1901 establishments in Michigan